Women's basketball clubs from Montenegro participated in FIBA competitions since the start of century. Clubs which played in European Cups until today are ŽKK Budućnost Podgorica and ŽKK Jedinstvo Bijelo Polje.
ŽKK Budućnost played in EuroLeague Women during the one season, but finished it after the group phase.

Performances by season
Below is a list of games of all Montenegrin clubs in FIBA competitions.

Performances by clubs
During the overall history, two different Montenegrin clubs played in FIBA competitions. ŽKK Budućnost played in every competition (EuroLeague Women, EuroCup Women, Ronchetti Cup), while ŽKK Jedinstvo played one season in EuroCup.

As of the end of FIBA competitions 2015–16 season.

Scores by opponents' countries
Below is the list of performances of Montenegrin clubs against opponents in FIBA competitions by their countries (basketball federations).

As of the end of FIBA competitions 2015–16 season.

See also
 First А Women's Basketball League of Montenegro
 Montenegrin Women's Basketball Cup

Women's basketball in Montenegro